Brad Martin (1973–2022) is an American country music artist.

Brad Martin may also refer to:
Brad Martin (snowboarder) (born 1986), Canadian snowboarder
Brad Martin (rugby league), English rugby league player
Brad Martin, character in Flight 7500